Chattenden Woods and Lodge Hill is a  biological Site of Special Scientific Interest north of Rochester in Kent. 

This site has diverse habitats, including ancient semi-natural woodland, grassland and scrub. There are nationally important numbers of nightingales in the woodland and scrub during the breeding season, and invertebrates include nationally scarce moths.

Public footpaths go through the woods.

References

Sites of Special Scientific Interest in Kent